Yahya Elnawasany (born 9 January 2002 in Tanta) is an Egyptian professional squash player. As of February 2020, he was ranked number 108 in the world. He won his first professional title in the 2020 Egyptian Squash Tour.

References

2002 births
Living people
Egyptian male squash players
People from Tanta
21st-century Egyptian people